The 2014 Amex-Istanbul Challenger was a professional tennis tournament played on hard courts. It was the 27th edition of the tournament which was part of the 2014 ATP Challenger Tour. It took place in Istanbul, Turkey between 8 and 14 September 2014.

Singles main-draw entrants

Seeds

 1 Rankings are as of September 1, 2014.

Other entrants
The following players received wildcards into the singles main draw: 
  Barış Ergüden
  Cem İlkel
  Barkın Yalçınkale
  Anıl Yüksel

The following players received entry from the qualifying draw:
  Juan Sebastián Gómez 
  Yannick Jankovits
  Dimitar Kuzmanov 
  Aleksandre Metreveli

Champions

Singles

 Adrian Mannarino def.  Tatsuma Ito, 6–0, 2–0, ret.

Doubles

 Colin Fleming /  Jonathan Marray def.  Jordan Kerr /  Fabrice Martin, 6–4, 2–6, [10–8]

External links
Official Website

American Express - TED Open
PTT İstanbul Cup
2014 in Turkish tennis